Narada Falls is a waterfall in Mount Rainier National Park, in the U.S. state of Washington.  It is said to be the most popular, because the Mount Rainier Highway crosses the falls between its two tiers.

The upper tier is a horsetail that falls in several strands down a nearly sheer cliff, into a canyon that is perpendicular to it. The lower tier is a much smaller plunge. During the winter, the upper falls freezes and becomes a sheer  of icicles, which attracts many ice climbers.

History 
The waterfall was originally called Cushman Falls, but the name was not widespread. The falls were named Narada by Arthur F. Knight during a week-long trip to Mount Rainier in 1893 for the Narada branch of the Theosophical Society of Western Washington, with Narada of a Hindu guru. Narada is also a Hindu word meaning and "pure" or "uncontaminated". A variant on the spelling is Neradah and a common mistake is "Nevada Falls".

See also
 Narada Falls Bridge

References

Landforms of Lewis County, Washington
Mount Rainier National Park
Waterfalls of Washington (state)
Tourist attractions in Lewis County, Washington
Tiered waterfalls
Waterfalls of Lewis County, Washington